Zolotukha is a rural locality (a village) in Ramenskoye Rural Settlement, Sheksninsky District, Vologda Oblast, Russia. The population was 17 as of 2002.

Geography 
Zolotukha is located 82 km north of Sheksna (the district's administrative centre) by road. Filyakovo is the nearest rural locality.

References 

Rural localities in Sheksninsky District